Cicero Park is the debut album by British soul band Hot Chocolate. It was released in June 1974 on the RAK Records label, owned by Mickie Most, who was the band's producer. The album peaked at number fifty-five on the US Billboard 200 album chart.

The original 1974 LP release comprised ten original songs by the band's writing team, lead vocalist Errol Brown and bassist Tony Wilson. The album included the group's first major international hit, "Emma" and "Disco Queen". Cicero Park did not contain the song "Brother Louie", which had been a 1973 US hit for the American band Stories, though the song replaced "Bump And Dilly Down" on US, Canada, Japan, and New Zealand editions of the album. The Hot Chocolate version of "Brother Louie" was later issued on CD as part of the 2009 Cicero Park bonus disc.

The album was issued on CD for the first time in an expanded 25-track 2-disc set in 2009.

Reception

Cicero Park has received varying reviews from contemporary critics.

In his obituary of Errol Brown in The Independent, Spencer Leigh praised the LP for its lyrical content:

"Although Hot Chocolate are known as a singles band, they should be commended for their 1974 album Cicero Park, which touched on issues of race and class. Many credit The Real Thing as being the first British band to do this, but Hot Chocolate's album pre-dates 4 from 8 by three years."

Alex Henderson writing for Allmusic gave the album a mixed review. Citing that Hot Chocolate's albums including Cicero Park tended to be mildly uneven, but more often than not, the material [on Cicero Park] is quite promising. Henderson praises the title track, the Curtis Mayfield-influenced "Could Have Been Born in the Ghetto", the funky "Disco Queen" but singles out "Emma" [as] a real treasure, although a depressing one.

Track listing
All tracks written by Errol Brown and Tony Wilson; except where indicated.

1974 LP issue
Side one
 "Cicero Park" – 4:41
 "Could Have Been Born in the Ghetto" (Theme from Love Head) – 5:50
 "A Love Like Yours" – 3:29
 "You're a Natural High" – 3:08
 "Emma" – 3:52

Side two
 "Changing World" – 4:31
 "Disco Queen" – 3:35
 "Makin' Music" – 3:45
 "Funky Rock 'n' Roll" – 4:48
 "Bump And Dilly Down" – 2:59

1974 US, Canada, Japan, and New Zealand issues 
Side one
 "Cicero Park" – 4:43
 "Could Have Been Born in the Ghetto" (Theme from Love Head) – 5:50
 "A Love Like Yours" – 3:30
 "You're a Natural High" – 3:07
 "Emma" – 3:51

Side two
 "Changing World" – 4:30
 "Disco Queen" – 3:30
 "Makin' Music" – 3:44
 "Funky Rock 'n' Roll" – 4:52
 "Brother Louie" – 4:57

2009 bonus disc
 "Love Is Life" – 3:39
 "Pretty Girls" – 2:26
 "You Could've Been a Lady" – 3:41
 "Everybody's Laughing" – 3:10
 "I Believe in Love" – 3:53
 "Caveman Billy" – 4:02
 "Mary Anne" – 3:54
 "Ruth" (Joe Chambers) – 4:02
 "You'll Always Be a Friend" – 3:29
 "Go Go Girl" – 3:49
 "Brother Louie" – 4:59
 "I Want to Be Free" – 2:51
 "Rumours" – 4:32
 "A Man Needs a Woman" – 3:56
 "Makin' Music" (Single Version) – 3:51

Charts

Personnel
Hot Chocolate
Errol Brown – lead vocals
Harvey Hinsley – guitar, backing vocals
Larry Ferguson – keyboards
Tony Wilson – bass, vocals, backing vocals
Tony Connor – drums
Patrick Olive – percussion, backing vocals

Production
Mickie Most – Producer (all tracks except bonus disc 2, 9, 10, 14)
Errol Brown and Tony Wilson – Producer (bonus disc 2, 9, 10, 14)
Chris Foster – Photography

References

Hot Chocolate (band) albums
1974 debut albums
Albums produced by Mickie Most
Albums recorded at Morgan Sound Studios
Rak Records albums